The athletics competitions at the 2013 Mediterranean Games in Mersin took place between 26 June and 29 June at the Nevin Yanıt Athletics Complex while half marathons were held at the Adnan Menderes Boulevard.

Athletes competed in 43 events and 1 paralympic event. Men's 20 km walk, men's decathlon, women's shot put and women's 1500m T54 were cancelled.

Medal summary

Men's events

Women's events

Paralympic events

Medal table
Italy, with 13 gold medals, finished first in the medal table.

Participating nations

 (2)
 (17)
 (2)
 (5)
 (4)
 (12)
 (8)
 (36)
 (34)
 (57)
 (2)
 (4)
 (2)
 (1)
 (2)
 (26)
 (1)
 (8)
 (12)
 (19)
 (1)
 (3)
 (60)

Doping cases
On 6 March 2015 IAAF announced that Moroccan Ahmed Baday who originally won gold medal in half marathon event had been suspended for two years for a biological passport anti-doping rule violation. His results from 26 March 2010 and onwards were annulled and get back his gold medal.

References

External links
 Official web site
 Results

Sports at the 2013 Mediterranean Games
2013
Mediterranean Games